Hemonia micrommata is a moth of the family Erebidae. It was described by Alfred Jefferis Turner in 1899. It is found in northern Australia.

References

Nudariina
Moths described in 1899